Cheshmeh-ye Seyyed Yaqub (also Romanized as Cheshmeh-ye Seyyed Yaʿqūb) is a village in Gurani Rural District, Gahvareh District, Dalahu County, Kermanshah Province, Iran. At the 2006 census, its population was 33, in 6 families.

References 

Populated places in Dalahu County